Hyposmocoma sordidella is a species of moth of the family Cosmopterigidae. It was first described by Lord Walsingham in 1907. It is endemic to the Hawaiian island of Kauai.

This species displays one of the most singular characters yet to be reported on the wings of Lepidoptera. On the forewing, vein 3 has become free from the membrane and has been developed as a thornlike process which protrudes from the scaling on the underside of the wing.

External links

sordidella
Endemic moths of Hawaii
Moths described in 1907
Taxa named by Thomas de Grey, 6th Baron Walsingham